NGC 119 is an unbarred lenticular galaxy with an apparent magnitude of 13.0 located in the constellation Phoenix. It was discovered on October 28, 1834 by the astronomer John Herschel.

See also 
List of NGC objects

References 

0119
Phoenix (constellation)
Lenticular galaxies